Outcome may refer to:

 Outcome (probability), the result of an experiment in probability theory
 Outcome (game theory), the result of players' decisions in game theory
 The Outcome, a 2005 Spanish film
 An outcome measure (or endpoint) in a clinical trial
The National Outcomes adopted as targets by the Scottish Government

See also
 Outcome-based education
 Outcomes theory